Meppadiyan is an Indian Malayalam-language drama thriller film written and directed by Vishnu Mohan and produced by Unni Mukundan Films. The film stars Unni Mukundan, Kottayam Ramesh, Saiju Kurup, Aju Varghese, Anju Kurian, Nisha Sarang and Kalabhavan Shajohn. The songs and background score for the film was composed by Rahul Subrahmanian. Filming took place in Aruvithura and Poonjar in late 2020. The film  released on 14 January 2022 to mixed reviews.

Plot 
Jayakrishnan enters into real estate business with Varkey; however, it becomes a trap for him and he loses his own home and land. The land that he ends up buying happens to be a property that the Central Government had marked for a Railway project. Jacob and Stella hides this fact about their property in order to get the money in any way possible for their daughter's marriage. With the help of a political shark Xavier, he sells that property to Ashraf Hajji, who had bought Jayakrishnan's ancestral home for a lower than fair market price by exploiting his dire situation. The film shows how an easy going person like Jayakrishnan changes into an animal of a corrupt society where bureaucracy and deceitful schemes wins over honesty and compassion.

Cast

Production
The film was shot around 48 different locations across Aruvithura and Pala with an ensemble cast. Filming began on 26 October 2020, in Aruvithura.

Soundtrack

The music of the film is composed by Rahul Subrahmanian. All lyrics are written by Joe Paul except Ayyappa Song was written by Vinayak Sasikumar and Niramizhiyode was written by Ajeesh Dasan.

Release
The release of the film was postponed several times due to COVID-19 pandemic in India. The film had a theatrical release on 14 January 2022.

Critical response
The Times of India rated 3.5 out of 5 and said that "The writer-director manages to really drive the tension to a peak with simply showing how our courts and particularly, government servants can make us sweat blood out of pure pettiness and arrogance ... Unni Mukundan is so wow that he is not Unni Mukundan, but Jayakrishnan ... This movie offers not just a glimpse at society, but also good character studies. It is a good film for the family to enjoy and discuss together". Malayala Manorama also rated 3.5 out of 5 and wrote: "Unni Mukundan follows his character with a well-balanced gait and has been able to deliver in total the tribulations ... The makers have been able to pull off a high drama by adopting scenarios of simple and real life events ... It may not be a highly thrilling drama but is nevertheless an engrossing tale that keeps viewers hooked till the credits roll up". The New Indian Express rated 3 out of 5 stars and said that the film is "supposed to be a respite from the action-heavy, macho posturing roles Unni did before, and in that regard, yes, the film lives up to its promise ... It's nice to see an actor like Unni making sincere efforts to change the audience’s perception of his acting capabilities".

References

External links
 
 

2020s Malayalam-language films
Indian thriller drama films
Indian films based on actual events
2022 films
Indian thriller films